Manarat El-Mostaqbal American School is a private coeducational day school offering an American curriculum for Pre-Kindergarten through Grade 12 launched in the academic year 2008 – 2009. It has been given the Northwest accreditation initially in 2007.

References 

American international schools in Egypt
Private schools in Cairo
International schools in Cairo
Educational institutions established in 2008
2008 establishments in Egypt